The Troubled Sleep of Piano Magic is the seventh album by Piano Magic.

Track listing 

 Saint Marie 5:40
 The Unwritten Law 3:20
 Speed the Road, Rush the Lights 7:44
 Help Me Warm This Frozen Heart 4:32
 I Am the Teacher's Son 6:29
 The End of a Dark, Tired Year 5:01
 The Tollbooth Martyrs 5:17
 When I'm Done, This Night Will Fear Me 5:05
 Luxembourg Gardens 7:27
 Comets 3:46

References

2003 albums
Post-rock albums by English artists
Piano Magic albums